Kicukiro District is one of the three Districts which constitute the City of Kigali and is situated in the South-East of the City of Kigali. Is a district (akarere) located in Kigali Province, Rwanda. Kicukiro is home to a thriving market, a number of NGOs(Non-Government Organizations) and the Bralirwa Brewery. In addition, it is the headquarters for the Friends Church in Rwanda. Kicukiro District is also home to two major memorial sites associated with the Rwandan genocide. These are the Rebero Genocide Memorial Site where 14,400 victims are buried, and the Nyanza Genocide Memorial Site where 5,000 victims were killed after Belgian soldiers who were serving in the United Nations peacekeeping forces abandoned them.

Geography 

This district is located in the south-east city of Kigali, the capital of Rwanda. It is made up to ten (10) administrative sectors (Imirenge), Kagarama, Niboye, Gatenga, Gikondo, Gahanga, Kanombe, Nyarugunga, Kigarama, Masaka, 41cells (Utugali) and 333 Administrative villages (imidugudu). The district covers a total area of 166.7 km2 with about 319,661 inhabitants. It was established by Organic Law n°29/2005 organizing the administrative entities of the Republic of Rwanda, at the start of the second phase of decentralization in January 2006.

Population 

The 4th Rwanda Population and Housing Census (PHC) has enumerated 318,564 residents in Kicukiro district, which represents 28.4% of the total population of Kigali City (1,132,686 residents). The population of Kicukiro district is predominantly male: 163,445 are men corresponding to 51.3% of the total population. Females are predominant in Masaka (50.6%) and Gahanga (50.2%) sectors. Gatenga, Kanombe, Kigarama, Nyarugunga and Masaka are the most populated sectors with more than 39 thousands residents each. Kagarama and Gikondo are the last populated sectors in Kicukiro district (14,385 and 17,146 inhabitants respectively). Each of them represents 4.5% of the total resident population of Kicukiro district.

{| class=wikitable style="margin: 1em 1em 0 0; border-collapse: collapse; font-size: 100%;" align="right"
|-bgcolor="#35682D" style="color:black"
! colspan="3" style="text-align:center; color:white; background:#2E8B57;"| Sectors of the Kicukiro District by population according to the 2022 census 
|-
! N°
! Sectors of  Kicukiro District
! 
|- align="center" style="background:#efefef; color:black 
! 1°| align="left"|
| align="right"|79,082
|- align="center" 
! 2°| align="left"|
| align="right"|78,788
|- align="center" style="background:#efefef; color:black 
! 3°| align="left"|
| align="right"|72,346
|- align="center"
! 4°| align="left"|
| align="right"|67,084
|- align="center" style="background:#efefef; color:black 
! 5°| align="left"|
| align="right"|63,153
|- align="center"
! 6°| align="left"|
| align="right"|49,247
|- align="center" style="background:#efefef; color:black 
! 7°| align="left"|
| align="right"|26,912
|- align="center"
! 8°| align="left"|
| align="right"|21,277
|- align="center" style="background:#efefef; color:black 
! 9°| align="left"|
| align="right"|19,803
|- align="center"
! 10°| align="left"|
| align="right"|14,039
|- align="center" bgcolor=#D0E7FF
! Total| align="left"|Kicukiro District 
| align="right"|491,731'|}

 Topography and climate 
The hydrographs of the District are largely constituted by streams and rivers which form a part of the basin of the Akagera River. The main rivers are the Akagera and the Nyabarongo, which flows through the city of Kigali from Lake Muhazi. The District has four seasons. Two rainy seasons and two dry seasons, alternating in the following manner: Small dry season: December, January and February Big rainy season March, April and May Big Dry season June, July, August and September Small rainy season October and November. These seasons are often irregular due to world climate changes. Lower or higher limits of each Season cannot be determined accurately. The rainy season may drag on into the dry season and vice versa. Average temperature is 22 °C for a rainfall varying between 900 and 1150 mm of annual rain.

 Integrated Polytechnic Regional Centre (IPRC) 
The 4th Rwanda Population and Housing Census (PHC) has enumerated 318,564 residents in Kicukiro district, which represents 28.4% of the total population of Kigali City (1,132,686 residents). The population of Kicukiro district is predominantly male: 163,445 are men corresponding to 51.3% of the total population. Females are predominant in Masaka (50.6%) and Gahanga (50.2%) sectors. Gatenga, Kanombe, Kigarama, Nyarugunga and Masaka are the most populated sectors with more than 39 thousands residents each. Kagarama and Gikondo are the last populated sectors in Kicukiro district (14,385 and 17,146 inhabitants respectively). Each of them represents 4.5% of the total resident population of Kicukiro district.

 Education (some universities) 

 Kicukiro College of Technology 
Kicukiro College of Technology is one of only two colleges of technology in Rwanda. The college opened in October 2008.Its vision is to emerge as a top-ranking management school in the world by providing excellent management education. The aim is to achieve global recognition as a leading player in the field of management education. We intend to provide a world class Management Education with Rwandan touch.

 Integrated Polytechnic Regional Centre (IPRC) 
IPRC was initially established by the Government of Rwanda in 2008 as "Kicukiro College of Technology (KCT)". Its core mission of the college was to develop and provide professional technical education at the level of diploma (A1). The college inherited the existing physical infrastructure from the ETO Kicukiro which seized to operate as a Technical Secondary School in 1994 when almost all of its equipment was vandalized during the genocide. After the genocide two secondary schools used the infrastructure consecutively up to January 2008.

In July 2008, the Government of Rwanda (GoR) decided to integrate Technical education, Vocational Education and Training into an integrated (TVET) system. Currently the college is among the two existing and operational Integrated Polytechnic Regional Centre (IPRC) in the country with its Mission and Vision changed to reflect its IPRC.

 References 

 
 Inzego.doc — Province, District and Sector information from MINALOC'', the Rwanda ministry of local government.

Kigali Province
Districts of Rwanda